Stochastic Gronwall inequality is a generalization of Gronwall's inequality and has been used for proving the well-posedness of path-dependent stochastic differential equations with local monotonicity and coercivity assumption with respect to supremum norm.

Statement 
Let  be a non-negative right-continuous -adapted process.

Assume that for all ,

where . 

and define .

		
If  and  has no negative jumps, then ;
		
If  then ;

Proof 
It has been proven by Lenglart's inequality.

References 
 

Stochastic differential equations
Articles containing proofs
Probabilistic inequalities